Effie Calavaza (born 1928) was a Native American Zuni jewelry artist.

Jewelry style 
Calavaza started silversmithing in 1956 and learned the art from her husband, Juan. Her signature style depicts snakes winding around large gemstones—most commonly turquoise, coral, and onyx—set in sand cast silver pieces including earrings, necklaces, rings, bracelets, watches, and belt buckles. Snakes are an important symbol in Zuni healing and fertility rituals. Experts in Native American art consider her an influential, prolific, and classic Zuni jewelry artist and her work is carried in jewelry galleries around the world.

Personal life 
Effie Calavaza was born in 1928 in Zuni, New Mexico as Effie Lankeseon, where she lived her entire life. She married Juan Calvaza (1910–1970), also a jewelry artist, who taught her the art. Until her husband's death in 1970, she signed her own work with her husband's signature, "JUAN C.–ZUNI). Later, she signed her work "EFFIE C.–ZUNI" in 1/16 Gothic print.

Calavaza has three daughters—Georgiana Yatsatti, Gloria Jean Garcia, and Susie Calavaza. She continued to smith jewelry as well as supervise the jewelry work of her daughters throughout her life.

References 

Native American jewelers

Native American women artists
1928 births
Possibly living people
Zuni people
Women jewellers